Rich Attonito (born June 16, 1977)  is a retired American mixed martial artist. A professional from 2004 until 2011, he fought in the UFC, Cage Warriors, King of the Cage, and was contestant on the 11th season of The Ultimate Fighter.

Background
Born and raised in New Jersey, Attonito was a 2001 graduate of Hofstra University in Long Island. Attonito wrestled several different weight classes as a member of the Pride wrestling team including the 167 lbs. and 197 lbs. divisions, picking up the team's award for "Most Improved Wrestler" in 2000.

Mixed martial arts

Early career
Attonito's interest in mixed martial arts was piqued when he saw his teammate from college, Phil Baroni, take the UFC by storm. However, he did not jump headlong into the sport until 2004, when, while working as a personal trainer in New Jersey, one of his coworkers and former heavyweight boxing title-contender Leo Loiacono, challenged him to make the most of his athletic abilities by competing in MMA. Attonito began training in boxing and jiu jitsu and soon took his first fight six months later.  After his fifth fight, in 2006, members of the American Top Team camp approached Attonito to see if he would be interested in training with them down in Florida.

The Ultimate Fighter
In March 2010, Attonito was announced as part of the eleventh season of The Ultimate Fighter.

In his first fight, to gain entry into the TUF house, Attonito defeated Lyle Steffens via unanimous decision (20–18, 20–18, 20–18). Chuck Liddell selected Attonito as his second pick, making him the 4th overall pick out of 14 competitors.

Rich's second fight came was against Kyacey Uscola. The fight ended due to Uscola throwing two illegal knees in round one, giving Rich the DQ win. After an MRI, it was revealed that Rich had broken his hand during the fight and will be unable to continue in the tournament. Rich's spot in the quarter-finals of the competition was taken by Court McGee, after perceived controversy over his loss to Nick Ring.

Ultimate Fighting Championship
Rich made his UFC debut at TUF 11 Finale against Team Ortiz fighter, Jamie Yager. He won the fight via TKO in the second round.

At UFC Fight Night: Marquardt vs. Palhares, Attonito faced debuting Brazilian Rafael Natal. Attonito won the fight via unanimous decision (29-28, 29-28, 30-27). During the first round of the fight, Attonito dropped Natal with a right hook which almost prompted the referee to stop the fight. The rest of the fight was close, however the knockdown was enough for Attonito to take the decision.

Attonito fought David Branch on December 4, 2010 at The Ultimate Fighter 12 Finale. He lost the fight via unanimous decision, getting dominated for all three rounds by Branch's superior ground skills.

Attonito was expected to drop to welterweight and face Matt Brown on June 26, 2011 at UFC on Versus 4. However, Martin Kampmann was forced out of his bout with John Howard with an injury and Brown was chosen as his replacement, while Attonito faced Daniel Roberts. He won the fight via unanimous decision (29-27, 30-27, 29-28).

Attonito faced promotional newcomer Jake Hecht on December 10, 2011 at UFC 140. He lost the fight via TKO in the second round.

Attonito was expected to face Rick Story on June 22, 2012 at UFC on FX 4.  However, Attonito was forced out of the bout with an injury and replaced by Papy Abedi.

Attonito was briefly linked to a bout against promotional newcomer Gunnar Nelson in a catchweight bout, contested at 175 lb. on September 29, 2012 at UFC on Fuel TV 5, replacing an injured Pascal Krauss.  However, Attonito had reservations about taking the short notice bout due to the weight cut requirements and DaMarques Johnson took on Nelson instead. After turning down the fight with Nelson at both 170 lbs. and at 175 lb. catchweight, Attonito was released from the UFC.

Mixed martial arts record

|-
| Loss
| align=center| 10–5
| Jake Hecht
| TKO (elbows and punches)
| UFC 140
| 
| align=center| 2
| align=center| 1:10
| Toronto, Ontario, Canada
| 
|-
| Win
| align=center| 10–4
| Daniel Roberts
| Decision (unanimous)
| UFC Live: Kongo vs. Barry
| 
| align=center| 3
| align=center| 5:00
| Pittsburgh, Pennsylvania, United States
|Return to Welterweight.
|-
| Loss
| align=center| 9–4
| David Branch
| Decision (unanimous)
| The Ultimate Fighter 12 Finale
| 
| align=center| 3
| align=center| 5:00
| Las Vegas, Nevada, United States
| 
|-
| Win
| align=center| 9–3
| Rafael Natal
| Decision (unanimous)
| UFC Fight Night: Marquardt vs. Palhares
| 
| align=center| 3
| align=center| 5:00
| Austin, Texas, United States
| 
|-
| Win
| align=center| 8–3
| Jamie Yager
| TKO (punches)
| The Ultimate Fighter 11 Finale
| 
| align=center| 2
| align=center| 4:25
| Las Vegas, Nevada, United States
| 
|-
| Win
| align=center| 7–3
| Gregory Babene
| Decision (unanimous)
| XC-1: Xtreme MMA Championship
| 
| align=center| 3
| align=center| 5:00
| Rome, Italy
| 
|-
| Win
| align=center| 6–3
| Uber Gallegos
| Submission (arm-triangle choke)
| KOTC: Hurricane
| 
| align=center| 1
| align=center| 3:31
| Ft. Lauderdale, Florida, United States
|Return to Middleweight.
|-
| Loss
| align=center| 5–3
| Isidro Gonzalez
| Submission (armbar)
| Cage Warriors 36: USA Destruction
| 
| align=center| 1
| align=center| 4:21
| Orlando, Florida, United States
|Welterweight debut.
|-
| Win
| align=center| 5–2
| Ryan Hodge
| TKO (punches)
| WFC 6: Battle in the Bay
| 
| align=center| 3
| align=center| 1:23
| Tampa, Florida, United States
| 
|-
| Win
| align=center| 4–2
| Rolando Dominique
| Submission (rear-naked choke)
| Ultimate Gladiator Championship
| 
| align=center| 1
| align=center| 4:06
| Miami, Florida, United States
| 
|-
| Loss
| align=center| 3–2
| Bristol Marunde
| TKO (punches)
| Euphoria: USA vs. Russia
| 
| align=center| 3
| align=center| 1:57
| Atlantic City, New Jersey, United States
| 
|-
| Win
| align=center| 3–1
| Lance Everson
| Decision (unanimous)
| Reality Fighting 9
| 
| align=center| 3
| align=center| 5:00
| Wildwood, New Jersey, United States
|Won the vacant Reality Fighting Light Heavyweight Championship.
|-
| Win
| align=center| 2–1
| Mark Raposa
| TKO (punches)
| Mass Destruction 18
| 
| align=center| N/A
| align=center| N/A
| Boston, Massachusetts, United States
| 
|-
| Loss
| align=center| 1–1
| Mike Marshall
| Decision (split)
| Mass Destruction 16
| 
| align=center| N/A
| align=center| N/A
| Boston, Massachusetts, United States
| 
|-
| Win
| align=center| 1–0
| Mike Mitchell
| TKO (punches)
| Mass Destruction 15
| 
| align=center| 1
| align=center| 2:26
| Boston, Massachusetts, United States
|

References

External links

Official UFC Profile

American male mixed martial artists
Middleweight mixed martial artists
Mixed martial artists utilizing collegiate wrestling
Mixed martial artists utilizing Brazilian jiu-jitsu
Living people
Mixed martial artists from New Jersey
American practitioners of Brazilian jiu-jitsu
American male sport wrestlers
Amateur wrestlers
American people of Italian descent
1977 births
Sportspeople from Elizabeth, New Jersey
Hofstra University alumni
People from Coconut Creek, Florida
Ultimate Fighting Championship male fighters